Bondia fuscata is a moth in the Carposinidae family. It was described by Davis in 1969. It is found in North America, where it has been recorded from Arizona.

Adults have been recorded on wing from July to August.

References

Natural History Museum Lepidoptera generic names catalog

Carposinidae
Moths described in 1969